"Star Mort Rickturn of the Jerri" is the tenth and final episode of the fourth season of the Adult Swim animated television series Rick and Morty. Written by Anne Lane and directed by Erica Hayes, the episode was broadcast on May 31, 2020, in the United States.

Plot 

Beth is leading a rebel group in a fight against the "new and improved" Galactic Federation. After the battle, Beth is nursed by a doctor, who asks her if she misses Earth, to which she reveals that there is a clone of her on Earth (confirming that Rick did in fact clone Beth in "The ABC's of Beth"). The doctor then discovers an explosive device with a built-in proximity device to Earth in Beth's neck, causing her to believe that Rick doesn't want her to return. On Earth, Beth and Jerry go to a family counseling at Dr. Wong's, while Morty and Summer fight over Rick's invisibility belt. Space Beth surprises and confronts Rick about the device in her neck. Rick reveals that the other Beth also has an explosive device in her neck that will transfer the other Beth's memories to Space Beth once it goes off. Space Beth and Rick then dine together at a restaurant, where Space Beth reveals she is now the most wanted criminal in the galaxy for battling against the reformed Galactic Federation. The Federation then arrives on Earth in search of Space Beth. Reacting to this information, Rick accidentally reveals that Space Beth might be the clone, and after freezing her in place to prevent her attacking him, proceeds to Dr. Wong's office to prevent Tammy and her squad from killing Beth and Jerry, having mistaken Beth for Space Beth. Rick rescues Beth and Jerry and they rendezvous with Space Beth. With both Beths now mad at Rick due to his refusal to disclose which of them is the clone, they are again attacked by Tammy, who takes them prisoner and beams them up to the Federation's ship. Morty and Summer intervene and Rick kills Tammy.

The family then heads to the ship, with Rick going to free the Beths while Morty and Summer shut off its superlaser before it can annihilate Earth. The Beths escape on their own as Rick is confronted by Birdperson (now Phoenixperson), who almost kills him before being shut down by Space Beth with help from Jerry, who used the invisibility belt in puppeteering a deceased Tammy. In the aftermath, Rick retrieves the memory tube containing his memory of creating the clone Beth, having erased his own knowledge of which Beth is the original one. No one else in the family wants the truth. Rick watches the memory nonetheless, only to learn that Beth asked him to decide for himself whether he wanted her in his life; his response was to use a centrifuge to randomize who was the original. After finally admitting to himself that he is "a terrible father," Rick tries to be a good friend instead and fix Phoenixperson (whose remains he retrieved after the battle), only to be aggressively rejected, so he shuts him down again. Rick is left alone and distraught.

In a post-credits scene, Jerry accidentally turns a garbage truck invisible, causing another car to crash into it and explode. After the drivers flee, he claims the invisible garbage truck, but it soon runs out of gas.

Production and writing 
The episode, revealed to be titled "Star Mort Rickturn of the Jerri" on April 14, 2020, was directed by Erica Hayes and written by Anne Lane. The title is a reference to the film Star Wars: Episode VI – Return of the Jedi. The song "Don't Look Back" by Ryan Elder and Lauren Culjak is played during the episode.

Reception

Broadcast and ratings 
The episode was broadcast by Adult Swim on May 31, 2020. According to Nielsen Media Research, "Star Mort Rickturn of the Jerri" was seen by 1.30 million household viewers in the United States and received a 0.69 rating among the 18–49 adult demographic.

Critical response 
Steve Greene of IndieWire awarded the episode a grade "B", saying that "with some subtle tweaks to a few of the show's past ideas, "Rick and Morty" heads into another off season on a surprisingly melancholy note." Joe Matar of Den of Geek gave the episode a 4.5 out of 5, saying:

References

External links 
 

2020 American television episodes
Rick and Morty episodes
Television episodes about cloning